Mhlumeni is a town in eastern Eswatini  on the border with Mozambique. It lies in the Lubombo Mountains about 40 kilometres north-east of Siteki in Lubombo District.

References 

Populated places in Lubombo Region
Eswatini–Mozambique border crossings